The Last Word is a Malaysian television lifestyle show created by Kassandra Kassim and hosted by Stephanie Chai that airs on Bernama TV. Each episode explores hip restaurants, exciting venues, and behind the scenes footage at the most exclusive media, fashion, and entertainment events present in Kuala Lumpur.

Format
The show consists of various segments dedicated to exploring facets of Kuala Lumpur life. Each segment which are each a few minutes long explores one dedicated topic such as fashion, food, or awards.

Featured segments
 Eye Witness: Focuses on either the Malaysian national pastime; eating, Fashion, or Creativity. In the past this has included coverage of restaurants such as Bijan Bar, Reunion (Chinese), and Bombay Palace (Indian). Also the MODA (Malaysian Official Designers Association) 20th Anniversary gala, and a showcase for upcoming Malaysian designers were covered.
 Word on the Street: Local events
 The KL Establishment: Interviews with established members of KL society
 Medal of Honor: Awards for local businesses
 Fashion Emergency: Makeover
 We the Jury: Fashion Critique

Cast and crew

Episode guide

Season 1 (2006–2007)

References

External links

2010 Malaysian television series debuts
2010s Malaysian television series